Iuliu Bodola Stadium is a multi-purpose stadium in Oradea, Romania. The stadium is the home ground of FC Bihor Oradea. Between 1924 and 1963, then between 2017 and 2022 it was the home ground of CA Oradea and between 1958 and 2016 it was the home ground of FC Bihor Oradea (1958). The stadium holds 11,155 people, restricted from 18,000. It used to be called Municipal, and in November 2008 the name was changed to Iuliu Bodola, after the famous player.

 It was opened in 1924.
 On this stadium plays FC Bihor.
 31st stadium in the country by capacity.

Events

Association football

Association football

See also
City of Oradea Stadium

External links
 See the position of the stadium on the city map

 

Sport in Oradea
Buildings and structures in Bihor County
Football venues in Romania
Buildings and structures in Oradea
Multi-purpose stadiums in Romania
CA Oradea
FC Bihor Oradea